Dorsetichthys is an extinct genus of stem-teleost ray-finned fish from the Early Jurassic period of Europe.

Description
Like them, however, it had a single dorsal fin, a symmetrical tail, and an anal fin placed towards the rear of the body. It had large eyes and was probably a fast-swimming predator, hunting planktonic crustaceans and smaller fish.

As an early stem-teleost, Dorsetichthys had many plesiomorphic characteristics that differentiated it from modern teleosts, such as ganoid scales and a spine that was partially composed of cartilage, rather than bone.

Taxonomy
The type species of Dorsetichthys, D. bechei, was formerly assigned to Pholidophorus, but Arratia (2013) recognized it as generically distinct from the Pholidophorus type species, placing it in the new family Dorsetichthyidae and new order Dorsetichthyiformes.

References

Prehistoric ray-finned fish genera
Jurassic bony fish
Mesozoic fish of Europe
Fossil taxa described in 2013